Alexandra Valeria Botez (born 1995) is an American-Canadian chess player and commentator,  Twitch streamer, and YouTuber. As a player, she became a five-time Canadian National Girls Champion and won the U.S. Girls Nationals at age 15. She achieved her highest FIDE Elo rating of 2092 in March 2016, and she currently holds the International Chess Federation title of Woman FIDE Master.

Botez began streaming online chess content in 2016 while she was a student at Stanford University, stating that in her first stream a majority of viewers were not interested in chess, but in her. Paired with her younger sister Andrea Botez, she now manages the BotezLive Twitch and YouTube channels, which have a combined total of more than 2,200,000 followers. 

Botez has publicly detailed her encounters with sexism and misogyny in tournament chess and has advocated for greater gender diversity. As a prominent female chess figure, she was elected to the Board of Directors of the Susan Polgar Foundation, a 501(c)3 nonprofit aiming to promote chess, with all its educational, social, and competitive benefits throughout the United States, for young people of all ages, especially girls.

Early life and background 
Botez was born to Romanian immigrant parents. Although she was born in Dallas, Texas, she was raised in Vancouver, British Columbia, Canada. Botez's father introduced her to chess and started training her when she was six. She eventually became a member of the Romanian Community Centre chess club, Golden Knights, coached by Chess Master Valer Eugen Demian.

Career

Chess 

In 2004, Botez won her first Canadian children's national championship at age eight. She eventually played for the National Canadian Team in 2010 and won four more Canadian youth national titles. After moving back to the United States, Botez won the U.S. Girls Nationals at age fifteen and twice represented the state of Oregon in the SPF Girls' Invitational. In 2013, Botez achieved the Woman FIDE Master title norm.

After attending high school in Oregon, Botez earned a full-ride chess scholarship to the University of Texas at Dallas. However, deciding to prioritize academics, she chose to study International Relations with a focus on China at Stanford University. During her sophomore year in 2014, Botez became the second female president of the Stanford University Chess Club after Cindy Tsai in 2005. She graduated in 2017.

In addition to her chess career, Botez served a brief stint as a chess commentator. She covered the 2018 and 2019 PRO Chess League Finals, the most popular team chess championship, along with IM Daniel Rensch, IM Anna Rudolf, and GM Robert Hess.

 Botez has a FIDE Elo rating of 2020 in standard chess and 2059 in blitz, placing her in the top 10 of Canadian female players.

Streaming 
In 2016, Botez started streaming chess content on Twitch during her junior year at Stanford University. Her channel quickly gained traction, and in 2020 she was joined by her younger sister Andrea Botez. Together, they host the BotezLive Twitch and YouTube channels, which have garnered more than 1,750,000 followers combined. The sisters frequently collaborate with other chess streamers on the platform, such as GM Hikaru Nakamura and WGM Qiyu Zhou.

Botez's streaming popularity has helped her become one of the most recognizable faces on the Chess.com platform. In response to her prominence as a female chess player, the mainstream media often compares Botez to the fictional Beth Harmon, protagonist of The Queen's Gambit.

Other professional work 
In 2017, Botez co-founded CrowdAmp, a social media company. As of May 2019, that company has ceased operations.

In April 2020, Botez was elected to the board of directors of the Susan Polgar Foundation, a non-profit 501(c)3 organization that advocates for breaking gender barriers in chess. Within the past eighteen years, the Susan Polgar Foundation has assisted in offering more than $6 million in chess scholarships and prizes to students.

In December 2020, the Botez sisters signed with the Texas-based esports organization Envy Gaming. By partnering with the Botez sisters, Envy hopes to expand its ambassador network with diverse gaming content creators.

Botez made $456,900 on a poker live stream on May 1, 2022 presented by the Hustler Live Casino which featured fellow streamers along with poker pros.

Playing style and notable games 
Botez often plays chess with an aggressive, adaptive style of play. In the 2016 Chess Olympiad held in Norway, she showcased her attacking style against opponent Anzel Solomons. During this match, Botez, playing as White, offers to exchange her rook for Solomons' knight on move 20. Solomon agrees to this exchange. However, this proves to be a tactical error which turns the game in Botez's favor. Seizing the opportunity, Botez sacrifices her bishop on move 21, ultimately allowing her to check with her queen on move 22 and check with her knight on move 23, thereby winning Solomons' queen on move 24. Having built a solid advantage, Botez advances her kingside pawns until Solomons resigns the game.1.d4 d5 2.c4 c6 3.Nf3 Nf6 4.Nc3 e6 5.e3 Nbd7 6.Bd3 Bd6 7.O-O O-O 8.b3 e5 9.cxd5 cxd5 10.Nb5 Bb8 11.dxe5 Nxe5 12.h3 Ne4 13.Bb2 Qf6 14.Nxe5 Bxe5 15.Bxe5 Qxe5 16.Rc1 Bd7 17.f4 Qe7 18.Nc7 Nc5 19.Nxd5 Qd6 20.Rxc5 Qxc5 21.Bxh7+ Kxh7 22.Qh5+ Kg8 23.Nf6+ gxf6 24.Qxc5 Bc6 25.Qf5 Kg7 26.Qg4+ Kh7 27.Qf5+ Kg7 28.e4 Rad8 29.Rf3 Rd1+ 30.Kh2 Rfd8 31.Rg3+ Kf8 32.Qc5+ Ke8 33.Rg8+ Kd7 34.Rxd8+ Kxd8 35.h4 Kc7 36.h5 Rd8 37.Qe7+ Rd7 38.Qxf6 Kc8 39.Qf5 

Botez's most-played opening is the King's Indian Defense, in which Black allows White to advance their pawns to the center of the board in the first two moves.

The "Botez Gambit", a tongue-in-cheek term, occurs when a player accidentally loses their queen. It originated with viewers of Botez's streams, but Botez has herself used it self-mockingly.

Views on sexism in chess 
Botez says she has encountered sexism in her chess career. Regarding her stream, Botez has stated that until she brought in moderators, she was disturbed by the fact that “60% of it was just people trying to flirt with me and chat, or people just commenting on my appearance the entire time... They didn’t care about the game play at all.” Competitive chess has always been dominated by men, with male Grandmasters outnumbering female Grandmasters 50-to-one. Botez says, "It has taken very long to get to the point where we're starting to change the stereotype [to show] that women are not genetically inferior to men at playing chess."

Though Netflix's The Queen's Gambit depicts a female protagonist's similar struggle as a chess player competing in the 1960s, Botez claimed the show understates the misogyny of that era. She said the show glossed over many realities, especially considering the decade it is set in: "If the show had been historically accurate, Beth wouldn't have been able to compete in any world championship events". Botez cited the case of female grandmaster Susan Polgar, who claimed that in 1986, she was prevented from competing in a zonal tournament, a qualifying event for the World Chess Championship, because of her gender. Nevertheless, Botez was complimentary of protagonist Beth Harmon as a nuanced and inspirational figure for upcoming women in chess.

Awards and nominations

References

External links 
 
 
 
 
 
 
 

1995 births
Living people
Chess Woman FIDE Masters
American female chess players
Canadian female chess players
Sportspeople from Dallas
American people of Romanian descent
Canadian people of Romanian descent
Twitch (service) streamers
YouTubers from Texas
Stanford University alumni
Canadian YouTubers
21st-century American women
People from Dallas
Streamer Award winners